Lee Kyoung-yoon (born February 21, 2000), also known by the mononym Kyoungyoon, is a South Korean singer and actor. He is a member of the boy group DKZ. He received his first main role as a television actor in a June 2021 EBS' international co-production drama, Beasts of Asia. He also starred in musical productions such as Equal and The Three Musketeers.

Early life and education 
Lee Kyoung-yoon was born on February 21, 2000, in Yeongdeok County, North Gyeongsang Province, South Korea. Kyoungyoon first dreamed of becoming a singer when he was in middle school after he heard Park Hyo-shin's "Beautiful Tomorrow". Before debuting as an idol, he had been training as an athlete and even formed a band where he was active as a guitarist and vocalist.

After graduating from high school, Kyoungyoon entered the Department of Broadcasting and Entertainment at Global Cyber University.

Career

2019–2021: Dongkiz
As a Dongyo trainee, Kyoungyoon was already part of group activities before his official debut. Kyoungyoon officially debuted on April 24, 2019, as part of the 5-member boy group, Dongkiz. Although the group has no assigned positions, he has been in charge of the vocals in the group.

During the release of their song Fever, Kyoungyoon was unable to join the group activities due to health problems. However, he later resumed group activities upon the release of their next single All I Need Is You the following year.

In June 2021, Kyoungyoon was cast in the EBS internationally co-produced series Beasts of Asia, his first main role on television. He was joined by his co-member Munik as part of its main cast.

On December 30, 2021, "2021 (Memories)" was released where Kyoungyoon participated in writing the song. This was part of the group's end-of-the-year project single and would later become the last song of the group before the renaming.

2022–present: DKZ 
On March 18, 2022, Kyoungyoon's label decided to rename their group DKZ and introduce line-up changes to form a 7-member boy group. In May 2022, Kyoungyoon (ranked 92nd) was included in the Top 100 K-Pop Boy Group Personal Brand Reputation Rankings for the said month which was released by the Korea Institute of Corporate Reputation. On May 26, 2022, he and Jaechan released an acoustic arrangement of their song "Cupid" (사랑도둑).

Kyoungyoon was cast in the musical "Equal" alongside his fellow member Jonghyeong, which marked their debut as theater actors, and in the 2022 South Korean musical production of "The Three Musketeers" with his fellow member Mingyu as D'Artagnan.

Discography

Music credits 
All song credits are adapted from the Korea Music Copyright Association's database, unless otherwise noted.

Filmography

Television series

Musicals

Awards and nominations

References

External links 
 
 

2000 births
Living people
K-pop singers
South Korean male singers
South Korean pop singers
21st-century South Korean male actors
21st-century South Korean male singers
South Korean male idols
South Korean male television actors
People from North Gyeongsang Province